The following article is a summary of the 2016–17 football season in Armenia, which is the 25th season of competitive football in the country and runs from August 2016 to May 2017.

League tables

Armenian Premier League

Armenian First League

Armenian Cup

Final

National team

2018 FIFA World Cup qualifiers

References

 
Seasons in Armenian football